Vincent Chancey (born February 4, 1950) is an American jazz hornist.

Early life and education 
Chancey was born and raised in Chicago. He earned a Bachelor of Arts degree in music from the SIUC School of Music in 1973 and studied under Julius Watkins in New York City.

Career 
Chancey began playing professionally in the 1970s, mostly with large ensembles such as the Sun Ra Arkestra, Lester Bowie's Brass Fantasy, David Murray Big Band, Carla Bley Big Band, and the Richard Abrams orchestra. He later performed and recorded with the Mingus Orchestra, Dave Douglas, Wayne Shorter, Herbie Hancock, Shirley Horn, Diana Krall, Elvis Costello, Mose Allison, Aretha Franklin, and Cassandra Wilson.

Discography

As leader
Welcome Mr. Chancey (1993)
Next Mode (1998, DIW Records)

As sideman
With Ahmed Abdullah
 Life's Force (About Time, 1979)
 Live at Ali's Alley (Cadence, 1980)
With Muhal Richard Abrams
Mama and Daddy (Black Saint, 1980)
Blues Forever (Black Saint, 1982)
Rejoicing with the Light (Black Saint, 1983)
With Carla Bley
Live! (Watt, 1981)
I Hate to Sing (Watt, 1981–83)
With Lester Bowie
I Only have Eyes for You (ECM, 1985)
Avant Pop (ECM, 1986)
Twilight Dreams (Venture, 1988)
Serious Fun (DIW, 1989)
Live at the 6th Tokyo Music Joy (DIW, 1990)
The Fire This Time (In & Out, 1992) 
The Odyssey Of Funk & Popular Music (Atlantic, 1998)
With Dave Douglas
Spirit Moves (Greenleaf, 2009)
United Front: Brass Ecstasy at Newport (Greenleaf, 2011)
Rare Metal (Greenleaf, 2011)
With Charlie Haden Liberation Music Orchestra 
Time/Life (Impulse!, 2011-2015 [2016])
With David Murray
Live at Sweet Basil Volume 1 (Black Saint, 1984)
Live at Sweet Basil Volume 2 (Black Saint, 1984)
David Murray Big Band (DIW/Columbia, 1991)
South of the Border (DIW, 1993)
With Herb Robertson
Shades of Bud Powell (JMT, 1988)
With Sun Ra
Live at Montreux (Inner City, 1976)
Cosmos (Cobra, 1976)
Unity (Horo, 1977)
Sleeping Beauty (El Saturn, 1979)
Live from Soundscape (DIW, 1979)

References

External links
Official website

American jazz horn players
Living people
CIMP artists
DIW Records artists
1950 births
Jazzhole members
Jazz musicians from Illinois
Jazz musicians from Chicago
American male jazz musicians
Southern Illinois University Carbondale alumni